Kent Alterman is an American film director and producer. He made his directorial debut in 2008 with Semi-Pro starring Will Ferrell.

Early life and Career
Alterman graduated in 1981 from the University of Oregon. He was president of Comedy Central until 2019.

References

External links

Living people
Year of birth missing (living people)
American film directors
American film producers
University of Oregon alumni